The Institut de microbiologie et des maladies infectieuses is a unit of the French national medical research institute INSERM. It is a member of GLOPID-R.

References 
 http://english.inserm.fr/ 

International medical and health organizations
Medical research institutes in France
Scientific agencies of the government of France